Pseudophyllodes is a genus of moths in the family Lasiocampidae. The genus was erected by George Thomas Bethune-Baker in 1910.

Species
Pseudophyllodes babooni Bethune-Baker, 1908
Pseudophyllodes cardinalis Holloway, 1976
Pseudophyllodes castanea Joicey & Talbot, 1917
Pseudophyllodes dinawa Bethune-Baker, 1904
Pseudophyllodes hades Bethune-Baker, 1908
Pseudophyllodes mafala Bethune-Baker, 1908
Pseudophyllodes melanospilotus Joicey & Talbot, 1917
Pseudophyllodes nigrostrigata Bethune-Baker, 1910
Pseudophyllodes purpureocastanea Rothschild, 1916
Pseudophyllodes rubiginea Bethune-Baker, 1904

References

Lasiocampidae